Medvedevo is a rural locality (a selo) in Orekhovskoye Rural Settlement, Danilovsky District, Volgograd Oblast, Russia. The population was 3 as of 2010. There are 2 streets.

Geography 
Medvedevo is located in steppe, on the right bank of the Medveditsa River, 53 km northeast of Danilovka (the district's administrative centre) by road. Tarasov is the nearest rural locality.

References 

Rural localities in Danilovsky District, Volgograd Oblast